Parliamentary elections were held in Togo on 27 October 2002. Like the previous elections in 1999, they were boycotted by nine opposition parties (known as the Coalition of Democratic Forces), following the  replacement of the Independent National Electoral Commission by a seven-magistrate committee and a revision of the Electoral Code. The result was a victory for the ruling Rally of the Togolese People, which won 72 of the 81 seats. Voter turnout was 67%.

Results

References

Togo
Parliamentary election
Elections in Togo
Election and referendum articles with incomplete results
Togolese parliamentary election